Prof. Nicolás Rojas Acosta (1873–1946) was an Argentine academic and botanist.

He explored the Gran Chaco in depth and was an expert in Bambusoideae and Cactaceae.

Works 
 Rojas Acosta, N. 1918. Addenda ad floram regionis Chaco Australis (pars secunda). Bull. Acad. Int. Géogr. Bot. 26: 157–158
 Rojas Acosta, N. 1897. Historia natural de Corrientes : catálogo. Mineralogía, Gea Paleontología, Flora i Fauna que comprende principalmente los vejetales i animales de las provincias i territorios limítrofes. Publicación Buenos Aires : Imprenta El Hogar y la Escuela, 1897, 214 p. 
 Rojas Acosta, N. 1915. Nociones sobre paleontología de Corrientes. Publicación [S.l.] : E. Dupuis, 1915

References

External links 

1873 births
1946 deaths
20th-century Argentine botanists
Pteridologists